Hristina Hristova Velcheva (born 21 January 1954 in Popitza, Vratsa Oblast) is a Bulgarian politician and former Member of the European Parliament (MEP). She is a member of the National Movement Simeon II, part of the Alliance of Liberals and Democrats for Europe, and became an MEP on 1 January 2007 with the accession of Bulgaria to the European Union.

External links
 European Parliament profile
 European Parliament official photo

1954 births
Living people
National Movement for Stability and Progress MEPs
MEPs for Bulgaria 2007
Women MEPs for Bulgaria
21st-century Bulgarian women politicians
21st-century Bulgarian politicians